Henry Gale Sanders (born August 18, 1942) is an American actor best known for his role in Charles Burnett's 1977 neo-realist film Killer of Sheep. He has also appeared extensively on television, on such programs as The Rockford Files, Tenspeed and Brown Shoe, Knight Rider, Knots Landing, Miami Vice, Cagney & Lacey, Married... with Children, Dr. Quinn, Medicine Woman,  NYPD Blue, and The Mentalist.

Filmography

 No Place to Hide (1970) - James Henderson
 The Devil's Garden (1973) - Cult Member with Cigar
 The Black Godfather (1974)
 Baby Needs a New Pair of Shoes (1974) - Sam Kingston 
 Independence Day (1976) - Charles
 Panama Red (1976) - John
 The Boss' Son (1978) - Charles
 Killer of Sheep (1978) - Stan
 Circle of Power (1981) - Harold
 Hard Country (1981) - Man Customer
 Endangered Species (1982) - Dr. Ross
 Deadly Sunday (1982) - Johnny 
 Breathless (1983) - Man with Pipe
 My Brother's Wedding (1983) - Beat-up man
 Weekend Pass (1984) - Officer Henry
 Choose Me (1984) - Hospital Administrator
 Heartbreakers (1984) - Reuben 
 Badge of the Assassin (1985) - Foreman #2 
 The Ladies Club (1986) - Cop No. 3 
 Made in Heaven (1987) - Henry
 No Man's Land (1987) - Heath 
 Bull Durham (1988) - Sandy
 Rainbow Drive (1990)
 The Man Inside (1990) - Evans 
 Child's Play 3 (1991) - Major
 Kuffs (1992) - Building Owner
 Carnival of Souls (1998) - Officer Soby
 Play It to the Bone (1999) - Cesar's Trainer
 Manhood (2003) - Police Officer
 The West Wing (2003) - Ambassador Tiki
 Berkeley (2005) - Gadsen
 Rocky Balboa (2006) - Martin
 Blues (2008) - Pop Boudreaux
 You Again (2010) - Chaplain
 CSI: Crime Scene Investigation (2010, TV Series) - Bill Gibson
 The Mentalist (2011) - Willie Shubert
 American Horror Story: Asylum (2012) - Willie
 42 (2013) - Max (uncredited)
 Grey's Anatomy (2013) - Dr. Hudson
 Whiplash (2014) - Red Henderson
 Crimes of the Mind (2014) - Judge Maynard
 Selma (2014) - Cager Lee
 American Horror Story: Hotel (2015)
 Blue: The American Dream (2016) - China Banks
 Hap and Leonard (2016–2017, TV Series) - Uncle Chester
 Queen Sugar (2016–Present, TV Series) - Prosper Denton
 Roman J. Israel, Esq. (2017) - Pastor Jack
 9-1-1 (2019) - Samuel Carter
 Charming the Hearts of Men (2021) - Abel
 Samaritan (2022) - Arthur Holloway

References

External links

1942 births
Living people
American male film actors
Male actors from Houston
African-American male actors
American male television actors
21st-century African-American people
20th-century African-American people